Christilot Hanson-Boylen (born 12 April 1947 in Jakarta, Indonesia) is a Canadian equestrian who competed as a member of the Canadian Equestrian Team in Dressage at six Olympic Games (1964, 1968, 1972, 1976, 1984, and 1992).

Boylen's mother was the late Javanese-born Canadian dancer, Willy Blok Hanson and her father was an Australian soldier. Her mother was of Chinese, Dutch, French, and Indonesian descent. Born in present-day Indonesia in 1947, she moved with her family to Toronto, Ontario, Canada, in 1951. Her parents divorced in the early 1970s.

She earned individual gold medals at the 1971, 1975 and 1987 Pan American Games, making her the only athlete to achieve three individual gold medals in Pan Am history. In addition, she has been a Canadian National Dressage Champion seven times.

At the Summer Olympics, her best performance was in 1976, when she came seventh in the individual competition and fifth in the team event. She was also the highest placed North American rider at the 1984 Olympics in the individual dressage when she came tenth.

She now lives in Germany. She has written two books and produced a video about dressage and is one of the founders of the non-profit Canadian Dressage Owners and Riders Association (CADORA).

Boylen retired from international team competition in July 2020.

See also
 List of athletes with the most appearances at Olympic Games

References

External links
 Archive of 2000 Biography from the Canadian Equestrian Federation
 
 2010 interview with Horse Canada
 

1947 births
Living people
Sportspeople from Jakarta
Canadian female equestrians
Olympic equestrians of Canada
Canadian dressage riders
Equestrians at the 1964 Summer Olympics
Equestrians at the 1968 Summer Olympics
Equestrians at the 1972 Summer Olympics
Equestrians at the 1976 Summer Olympics
Equestrians at the 1984 Summer Olympics
Equestrians at the 1992 Summer Olympics
Indonesian emigrants to Canada
Canadian people of Australian descent
Canadian sportspeople of Chinese descent
Canadian people of Dutch descent
Canadian people of French descent
Canadian sportspeople of Indonesian descent
Sportspeople from Toronto
Equestrians at the 1967 Pan American Games
Equestrians at the 1971 Pan American Games
Equestrians at the 1975 Pan American Games
Equestrians at the 1987 Pan American Games
Pan American Games gold medalists for Canada
Pan American Games silver medalists for Canada
Pan American Games bronze medalists for Canada
Pan American Games medalists in equestrian
Medalists at the 1987 Pan American Games